Haveli Baghal is a village in the Dadyal tehsil of Mirpur District of Azad Kashmir, Pakistan.

Demography
According to the 1998 census, its population was 761.

History
Like many villages in the Mirpur region, many of its residents have emigrated to the United Kingdom. The village means the mansion of the Baghal. The Baghal are a Rajput clan, ghakhar kiani Rajput.

References

Populated places in Mirpur District